Gymnodactylus is a genus of Brazilian geckos, commonly known as naked-toed geckos, in the family Phyllodactylidae.

Species
The following five species are recognized as being valid.

Gymnodactylus amarali Barbour, 1925
Gymnodactylus darwinii (Gray, 1845)
Gymnodactylus geckoides Spix, 1825
Gymnodactylus guttulatus Vanzolini, 1982
 Gymnodactylus vanzolinii Cassimiro & Rodrigues, 2009

Nota bene: A binomial authority in parentheses indicates that the species was originally described in a genus other than Gymnodactylus.

References

Further reading
Spix JB (1825). Animalia nova sive species novae lacertarum, quas in itinere per Brasiliam annis MDCCCXVII – MDCCCXX jussu et auspiciis Maximiliani Josephi I. Bavariae Regis suscepto collegit et descripsit. Munich: F.S. Hübschmann. Index (4 unnumbered pp.) + 26 pp. + 30 color plates. (Gymnodactylus, new genus, p. 17). (in Latin).

 
Lizard genera
Taxa named by Johann Baptist von Spix